The Rigi Hochflue is a mountain summit west of the mountain range Urmiberg, in itself part of the Rigi massif, overlooking the Gersauerbecken of Lake Lucerne in Central Switzerland on its mountainside to the south, and Lake Lauerz on its north side.

References

External links
 Rigi Hochflue on Hikr

Mountains of Switzerland
Mountains of the Alps
Mountains of the canton of Schwyz
One-thousanders of Switzerland